Harku Prison was an Estonian prison. The prison was located in Harku, Harju County.

The prison was established in 1926.

1965 the prison was adapted to women's prison.

2011 Harku Prison was merged to Murru Prison.

2016 Harku and Murru Prison was merged to Tallinn Prison. Prisoners were transported to Tallinn, Tartu and Viru Prison.

References

Prisons in Estonia
Harku Parish